The leafy klipfish (Smithichthys fucorum) is a species of clinid found along the coast of South Africa from Cape Point to the Bashee River. Its preferred habitat is amongst seaweed in the subtidal zone. It is currently the only known member of its genus. The generic name honours the South African ichthyologist J.L.B. Smith  (1897-1968), while the specific name means belonging to the brown seaweed genus Fucus, a reference to its habitat, colouring, and form.

References

Clinidae
Fish described in 1908
Monotypic fish genera
Taxa named by John Dow Fisher Gilchrist
Taxa named by William Wardlaw Thompson